Alexander Marshall Lodge (1881–1938) was an English inventor who did early work and held some patents  on the spark plug. He and his brother Brodie (1880–1967) founded a company, Lodge Bros, in 1903 - which eventually, following a merger with the Mascot Company in 1913, was renamed Lodge Plugs Ltd; it was based in Rugby, Warwickshire. Much of their work was developed from research by their father, Sir Oliver Lodge.

Alec Lodge died on 17 February 1938, aged 56.

External links
 History of Lodge Plugs

1881 births
1938 deaths
People from Rugby, Warwickshire
20th-century British inventors